The Nore Power Station  is a hydroelectric power station located in the municipality Nore og Uvdal in Buskerud, Norway.

See also

References 

Hydroelectric power stations in Norway
Buildings and structures in Buskerud